Anderson School District Five is a school district headquartered in Anderson, South Carolina, United States.

Schools
High schools:
 T. L. Hanna High School
 Westside High School

Middle schools:
 Robert Anderson Middle School
 Glenview Middle School
 
 McCants Middle School
 Southwood Academy of the Arts

Elementary schools:
 Calhoun Academy of the Arts
 Centerville Elementary School
 Concord Elementary School
 Homeland Park Primary School
 McLees Elementary School
 Midway Elementary School
 Nevitt Forest Elementary School
 New Prospect Elementary School
 North Pointe Elementary School
 Varennes Elementary School
 Whitehall Elementary School

Preschool:
 South Fant School of Early Education
 West Market School of Early Education

CF Reames Education Center:
 Anderson Five Virtual Academy
 Anderson Five Charter School
 Anderson Five Bridge Academy

Multi-District Shared Facilities:
Anderson Institute of Technology 3, 4, & 5
Anderson Adult Education Center 3, 4, & 5

References

External links
 

School districts in South Carolina
Education in Anderson County, South Carolina